Dasylophia thyatiroides, the gray-patched prominent, is a species of prominent moth in the family Notodontidae. It was described by Francis Walker in 1862 and is found in North America.

The MONA or Hodges number for Dasylophia thyatiroides is 7958.

References

 Lafontaine, J. Donald & Schmidt, B. Christian (2010). "Annotated check list of the Noctuoidea (Insecta, Lepidoptera) of North America north of Mexico". ZooKeys. 40: 1-239.
 Metzler, E. & Knudson, E. (2011). "A new species of Elasmia Möschler from New Mexico and Texas, and a new subspecies of Elasmia mandela (Druce) from Texas and Oklahoma (Lepidoptera, Notodontidae, Nystaleinae)". ZooKeys. 149: 51-67.

Further reading

 Arnett, Ross H. (2000). American Insects: A Handbook of the Insects of America North of Mexico. CRC Press.

Notodontidae